In the United Kingdom, a sex establishment licence is a form of licence required for carrying on some types of sex-related businesses. Sex establishment licences are granted by local authorities, under the powers granted by the Local Government (Miscellaneous Provisions) Act 1982.

There are three classes of sex establishments: sex shops, sex cinemas, and sexual entertainment venues.

Sexual entertainment venues 
Sexual entertainment venues are defined in the Policing and Crime Act 2009, and are regulated by local authorities under the Local Government (Miscellaneous Provisions) Act 1982. This classification was originally intended to regulate lap-dancing clubs, but also extends to venues where other kinds of sex-related entertainment takes place, including live sex shows and peep shows.

See also 
Strip club

References 

Licenses
Sex laws
Sex industry
Law of the United Kingdom